Mangua is a genus of araneomorph spiders in the family Physoglenidae that first described by Raymond Robert Forster in 1990. Originally placed with the Synotaxidae, it was moved to the Stiphidiidae in 2017.

Species
 it contains fourteen species, found on the Polynesian Islands:
Mangua caswell Forster, 1990 – New Zealand
Mangua convoluta Forster, 1990 – New Zealand
Mangua flora Forster, 1990 – New Zealand
Mangua forsteri (Brignoli, 1983) – New Zealand (Auckland Is., Campbell Is.)
Mangua gunni Forster, 1990 (type) – New Zealand
Mangua hughsoni Forster, 1990 – New Zealand
Mangua kapiti Forster, 1990 – New Zealand
Mangua makarora Forster, 1990 – New Zealand
Mangua medialis Forster, 1990 – New Zealand
Mangua oparara Forster, 1990 – New Zealand
Mangua otira Forster, 1990 – New Zealand
Mangua paringa Forster, 1990 – New Zealand
Mangua sana Forster, 1990 – New Zealand
Mangua secunda Forster, 1990 – New Zealand

See also
 List of Physoglenidae species

References

Araneomorphae genera
Physoglenidae
Spiders of New Zealand
Taxa named by Raymond Robert Forster